Pepin III, Count of Vermandois (also known as Pepin II, Count of Senlis; French: Pépin) (c. 846 – 893) was a Frankish noble; the Count of Senlis and Count of Vermandois (850 – 893); Lord of Valois (877 – 886), and later Count of Valois (886 – 893). He was a son of Pepin, Count of Vermandois and Valois and thus a grandson of Bernard of Italy, who was himself a grandson of Charlemagne. The brothers of Pepin III were Herbert I, Count of Vermandois and Bernard II, Count of Laon.

Pepin III of Vermandois's wife's name and origin are unknown; their son was:
Pepin III of Senlis (876 – 922), Count of Senlis.

Notes

References

Herbertien dynasty
Counts of Vermandois
840s births
893 deaths
Counts of Valois
Carolingian dynasty